Wooden Staircase is a feature film of Lithuanian-Canadian screenwriter and film director Vidas Rasinskas.

Plot summary
Wooden Staircase is a poetic drama of Time and Fate, a metaphor, leading to introspection. Two young people, connected through Time and Fate, are looking for consensus and comprehension between themselves. There is a mystic protagonist, Thomas. He embodies the famous writer Thomas Mann’s spirit, living beyond the time. Thomas lets the young protagonist, Vilius, go back to his past and compels him to face the results of his former mistakes. A rendezvous with the past has a large influence on Vilius present.

Recognition 
The premiere of Wooden Staircase, (93 min. version) was at the International Film Festival Cottbus, Germany in 1993.
The film Wooden Staircase, (56 min. version) won the competition in Moscow and was selected as the best student work of the year. It was presented for the 22nd Student Academy Award in 1995.

References 
Grazina Arlickaite, Lithuanian Films 1990-1998 (Lietuvių filmai 1990-1998), Lithuania, 1998 
Astrida Baranovskaya, Stairs, K Ekranu, Russia, 1994
Piotr Niemiec, Die holzerne Treppe, Germany, 1993
Virginija Januseviciene, Staircase Lead to the World of Metaphors, Lietuvos rytas, Lithuania, 1993
Richard Miller, 22nd Student Academy Awards, USA, 1995

External links 

Film Festival Cottbus, Mediniai laiptai, Die Hölzerne Treppe
Lithuanian Film Center, Wooden Staircase
Wooden Staircase, Review
Pacific Time Films, Vidas Rasinskas

Lithuanian drama films
1993 films